NGC 813 is a lenticular galaxy in the constellation Hydrus. It is estimated to be 390 million light-years from the Milky Way and has a diameter of approximately 140,000 ly. NGC 813 was discovered on November 24, 1834 by the British astronomer John Herschel.

See also 
 List of NGC objects (1–1000)

References 

Lenticular galaxies
Hydrus (constellation)
0813
007692